Somers is a city in Calhoun County, Iowa, United States. The population was 128 at the time of the 2020 census.

History
Somers was platted in 1900 as a shipping point on the railroad.

Geography
Somers is located at  (42.377902, -94.431013).

Demographics

2010 census
As of the census of 2010, there were 113 people, 55 households, and 32 families living in the city. The racial makeup of the city was 95.6% White, 0.9% Asian, and 3.5% from two or more races.

There were 55 households, of which 27.3% had children under the age of 18 living with them, 41.8% were married couples living together, 14.5% had a female householder with no husband present, 1.8% had a male householder with no wife present, and 41.8% were non-families. 38.2% of all households were made up of individuals, and 16.4% had someone living alone who was 65 years of age or older. The average household size was 2.05 and the average family size was 2.63.

The median age in the city was 48.1 years. 21.2% of residents were under the age of 18; 5.3% were between the ages of 18 and 24; 20.4% were from 25 to 44; 32.6% were from 45 to 64; and 20.4% were 65 years of age or older. The gender makeup of the city was 53.1% male and 46.9% female.

2000 census
As of the census of 2000, there were 165 people, 61 households, and 51 families living in the city. The racial makeup of the city was 97.58% White, 0.61% African American, 1.82% from other races. Hispanic or Latino of any race were 3.03% of the population.

There were 61 households, out of which 27.9% had children under the age of 18 living with them, 67.2% were married couples living together, 13.1% had a female householder with no husband present, and 14.8% were non-families. 9.8% of all households were made up of individuals, and 4.9% had someone living alone who was 65 years of age or older. The average household size was 2.70 and the average family size was 2.92.

In the city, the population was spread out, with 24.8% under the age of 18, 8.5% from 18 to 24, 24.8% from 25 to 44, 22.4% from 45 to 64, and 19.4% who were 65 years of age or older. The median age was 40 years. For every 100 females, there were 103.7 males. For every 100 females age 18 and over, there were 96.8 males.

The median income for a household in the city was $31,250, and the median income for a family was $43,750. Males had a median income of $32,083 versus $21,250 for females. The per capita income for the city was $15,777. About 11.5% of families and 15.9% of the population were below the poverty line, including 33.3% of those under the age of eighteen and 16.0% of those 65 or over.

Education
Somers is served by the Prairie Valley Community School District, which formed on July 1, 1993 with the merger of the Cedar Valley Community School District and the Prairie Community School District.

References

Cities in Calhoun County, Iowa
Cities in Iowa